Fulton County Airport  is a county-owned, public-use airport in Fulton County, New York, United States. It is two nautical miles (3.7 km) east of the central business district of Johnstown. This airport is included in the FAA's National Plan of Integrated Airport Systems for 2009–2013, which categorized it as a general aviation facility.

Facilities and aircraft 
It has one runway designated 10/28 with an asphalt surface measuring 4,000 by 75 feet (1,219 x 23 m).

For the 12-month period ending June 10, 2008, the airport had 9,700 general aviation aircraft operations, an average of 26 per day. At that time there were 35 aircraft based at this airport: 91% single-engine and 9% multi-engine.

In popular culture
The Fulton County Airport was featured in a two-part episode of the television series The X-Files in 1997. Several scenes in the episodes "Tempus Fugit" and "Max" were shown to have taken place at an airport depicting Fulton County. However no actual footage was shot there. The episodes also depict the village of Northville which is in northeastern Fulton County.

References

External links 
 Fulton County Airport (NY0) at NYSDOT Airport Directory
 Aerial image as of April 1997 from USGS The National Map
 
 

Airports in New York (state)
Transportation in Fulton County, New York